Molong railway station  is a heritage-listed former railway station and now library on the Main Western railway line at Molong, Cabonne Shire, New South Wales, Australia. The property was added to the New South Wales State Heritage Register on 2 April 1999.

History 

The station opened in 1885, and was the terminus of the line between 1886 and 1893. It is now closed to passenger services.

The station closed in the early 1990s. The goods shed was demolished at that time, and the station was also faced with prospective demolition, but was saved by the efforts of local residents.

Of timber construction, the station survives largely intact, is well maintained and is in use by various local community groups and a branch of the Central Western Libraries. North of the station (westwards along the railway) lies the junction point to the now-closed Molong- Dubbo railway line.

The library was relocated from the station building in late 2018, resulting in concern for the building's future.

Currently the station has seen the cessation of services for passenger trains and operates as a museum.

Description 

The heritage-listed complex includes a timber station building of a type 4 standard roadside design with a brick platform dating from 1885. It also includes a gable-roof, pre-cast concrete signal box dating from 1924. Two locomotive water columns dating from  1900, the timber road overbridge, and the Bunya pine (Araucaria bidwillii) tree outside the station are also included in the heritage listing.

Heritage listing 

Molong is an excellent example of a standard timber wayside station with excellent detailing a good setting and good supporting buildings. The station has prominence in the main street and is an important visual part of the historic character of the town. The station building is the main element of the group but its setting is important to the way the buildings are seen in the town.

The bridge is a good example of a once common but now rare timber bridge structure.

Molong railway station was listed on the New South Wales State Heritage Register on 2 April 1999 having satisfied the following criteria.

The place possesses uncommon, rare or endangered aspects of the cultural or natural history of New South Wales.

This item is assessed as historically rare. This item is assessed as arch. rare. This item is assessed as socially rare.

See also

References

Bibliography

Attribution

External links

New South Wales State Heritage Register
Disused regional railway stations in New South Wales
Articles incorporating text from the New South Wales State Heritage Register
Railway stations in Australia opened in 1885
Molong